Straight to DVD II: Past, Present and Future Hearts is the second live album by American rock band All Time Low, after the first Straight to DVD in 2010. It was released on September 9, 2016, and the footage was recorded at Wembley Arena.

Track listing

Personnel
All Time Low
 Jack Barakat - lead guitar, backing vocals
 Alex Gaskarth - rhythm guitar, vocals
 Rian Dawson - drums
 Zack Merrick - bass, backing vocals
Additional musicians
 Bryan Donahue - auxiliary guitar, backing vocals
Live crew
 Brian Southall - tour management
 Steve Hussein - tour management (assistant)
 Daniel Nickleski - production management, monitor engineer
 Phil Gornell - front of house engineer
 Jeff Maker - lighting designer
 Kyle Arndt - guitar technician
 Alan Fraser - guitar technician
 Alex Grieco - drum technician
 Adam Elmakias - photographer

References

2016 live albums
2016 video albums
Live video albums
All Time Low albums